Ahmad Aghalou (also Romanized as Ahmad Āghālu; 1949 in Qazvin – 2008 in Tehran) was an Iranian actor.

Biography 
Ahmad Aghaloo was born in 1328 in Qazvin. He was a theater graduate of the Faculty of Fine Arts, University of Tehran. He entered the cinema as an actor by acting in the movie Dadshah in 1983. The last movie was Spadash, in which he starred in 2008.

Filmography

Cinema
 Dadshah - 1984
 Silk Chains - 1985
 Patal and Little Wishes - 1989
 The Kids from Water and Mud - 1993
 Rich and Poor - 1999
 Look at the Sky - 2002

References

External links
 

1949 births
2008 deaths
People from Qazvin
Deaths from cancer
Iranian male film actors
Iranian male stage actors
Iranian male voice actors
University of Tehran alumni
Iranian male television actors
Burials at artist's block of Behesht-e Zahra